Reinaldo Lenis Montes (born 20 July 1992) is a Colombian professional footballer who plays as a winger for Saudi Arabian club Al-Adalah.

He has been nicknamed "The Legend from Cali."

Career
On 19 June 2022, Lenis joined Saudi Pro League club Al-Adalah.

Honours
Sport Recife
Ariano Suassuna Trophy: 2016, 2017, 2018
Campeonato Pernambucano: 2017

References

External links
 
 

1992 births
Living people
Colombian footballers
Colombian expatriate footballers
Argentine Primera División players
Primera Nacional players
Campeonato Brasileiro Série A players
Expatriate footballers in Argentina
Argentinos Juniors footballers
Sport Club do Recife players
Atlético Nacional footballers
Club Atlético Banfield footballers
Expatriate footballers in Brazil
Colombian expatriate sportspeople in Brazil
Association football midfielders
Footballers from Cali
Saudi Professional League players
Al-Adalah FC players
Expatriate footballers in Saudi Arabia
Colombian expatriate sportspeople in Saudi Arabia